Freilichtbühne Ötigheim  is an open-air theatre in Ötigheim, Baden-Württemberg, Germany.

Theatres in Baden-Württemberg